Sir Henry Babington-Smith  (29 January 1863 – 29 September 1923) was a senior British civil servant, who served in a wide range of posts overseas, mostly financial, before becoming a director of the Bank of England. He was related to the Babington family through his maternal grandmother Mary, a daughter of Thomas Babington, and his children took the double surname Babington Smith.

Early life and education
Smith was born at Riverbank, Putney, London on 29 February 1863, the son of the lawyer and mathematician Archibald Smith. His brothers were James Parker Smith, later an MP, and Arthur Hamilton Smith, later Keeper of Greek and Roman Antiquities at the British Museum. He was educated at Eton College and Trinity College, Cambridge, where he read classics. He was a Cambridge Apostle.

Career
In 1887 he joined the Board of Education as an examiner, but in 1891 became principal private secretary to the new Chancellor of the Exchequer, George Goschen.

In 1894 he became private secretary to Lord Elgin on his appointment as Viceroy of India. This relationship was cemented when he married the Viceroy's eldest daughter, Lady Elisabeth Mary Bruce (1877–1944), on 22 September 1898 in Simla. For his work in India, he was appointed Companion of the Order of the Star of India (CSI) in 1897.

He returned to Britain in 1899 and was immediately sent to Natal as Treasury representative in the South African War. In 1900 he became British representative on the Council of Administration of the Ottoman Public Debt, in the nominally-Ottoman Egypt, becoming its chairman in 1901. In the same year he was awarded the Osmanieh Order, Class 1. In 1903 he returned home to become secretary to the General Post Office, and was appointed Companion of the Order of the Bath (CB) in 1905 and Knight Commander of the Order of the Bath (KCB) in 1908.

In 1909, he went to Constantinople as president of the National Bank of Turkey, which he was instrumental in establishing. He turned down the post of Governor of Bombay, one of the most prestigious posts in the administration of India, because it was usually accompanied by a peerage. Smith explained to his children: "[n]o man is wise who burdens a large family with such trappings. I did without them and so can you."

The First World War saw him holding a variety of posts connected with finance, including deputy governor of the British Trade Corporation. In 1915 he participated in the Anglo-French Financial Commission to the United States. He was appointed to the Order of the Companions of Honour (CH) in 1917. In 1918 he accompanied Lord Reading to the United States as Assistant Commissioner and Minister Plenipotentiary.

After the war, he chaired the Indian Finance and Currency Committee in 1919 and the Railway Amalgamation Tribunal in 1921. He was appointed a director of the Bank of England in 1920.

Smith was appointed Knight Grand Cross of the Order of the British Empire (GBE) in the 1920 civilian war honours for his services in the United States.

Family

Babington Smith married Lady Elizabeth Bruce (1877–1944), the eldest daughter of Victor Bruce, 9th Earl of Elgin, the Viceroy of India. They had four sons and five daughters:

Michael Babington Smith (1901–1984): Brigadier, CBE, TD
 Henry Babington Smith (1902–1982)
Bernard Babington Smith (1905–1993): OBE
Margaret Babington Smith 1907–1997), married Charles de Bunsen 
David Babington Smith (1909–1989)
Lucy Babington Smith (1910–2005), married Henry Sinclair, 2nd Baron Pentland
Constance Babington Smith (1912–2000): MBE, Legion of Merit
Susan Babington Smith (1917–2003), married Sir Anthony Wakefield Cox
Elizabeth Babington Smith (1921–2008): MD, FFARCS, married to Reece Lloyd-Jones

The family home was Chinthurst, in Wonersh.

Ancestry

Footnotes

References
Obituary, The Times, 1 October 1923
"Here be Forebears – The Ancestry of Archibald Smith II of Jordanhill", H.E. Babington Smith, 1997

1863 births
1923 deaths
People from Jordanhill
People educated at Eton College
Alumni of Trinity College, Cambridge
Secretaries of the General Post Office
Civil servants in the Department of Education (United Kingdom)
Civil servants in HM Treasury
Knights Grand Cross of the Order of the British Empire
Members of the Order of the Companions of Honour
Knights Commander of the Order of the Bath
Companions of the Order of the Star of India
Private secretaries in the British Civil Service
Foreign recipients of the Legion of Merit
Henry
People associated with the Bank of England
British people in colonial India